Roja Kootam is a 2002 Indian Tamil-language romance film directed by Sasi. The film stars Srikanth and Bhumika in lead roles. The film's score and soundtrack are composed by Bharadwaj. This was Srikanth's debut movie and catapulted him into stardom. The film was dubbed in Telugu as Roja Poolu. The film was remade in Kannada as Manasina Maathu with Ajay Rao and Aindrita Ray in 2011.

Plot
Ilango and Sriram are best friends. Ilango is his parents' only son, who aren't interested in anything but his academics. However Ilango is not interested in academics and wants to set up business. He falls in love with Manohari, who also eventually happens to reside opposite their house, with her loudmouthed sub-inspector mother. With the responsibilities of a brother to get his sisters married, Sriram leaves for Libya on a job received through Ilango's parents. Before he leaves, he tells Ilango that Mano and himself are in love, and asks Ilango to look after his lover until he is back. Ilango swallows his love secret for the sake of friendship. Meanwhile, Manohari's mother arranges for her to marry Vijay Adhiraj for his wealth. At this juncture, Mano and Ilango lie that they are already married. They both leave their parents, and Ilango starts earning to support Mano. Finishing his job assignment, Sriram returns, only to give yet another family responsibility as an excuse. He apologizes for not being able to marry Mano as he is a tight corner to marry somebody else for the sake of his sister's marriage. Later, Mano leaves to Mumbai after a job opportunity. Ilango's parents learn that he and Mano are not married. They accept them. Radhika knows Mano as the girl Ilango loved, but he would not accept it since Mano might think wrong of him. Later in the train station, things turn plates and Mano learns that she is the girl he loved and accepts him.

Cast

Srikanth as Ilango
Bhumika as Manogari aka Mano
Raghuvaran as Ilango's father
Raadhika as Ilango's mother
Vivek as Auto Aarumugam
Raghava Lawrence in the song Suppamma
Mumtaj in the song Suppamma
Akash as Sriram
Devan
Rekha as Mano's mother
Vijay Adhiraj as Mano's arranged husband
Suvarna Mathew as Kiran
Shanthi Williams as Sriram's mother
Bava Lakshmanan as Auto Aarumugam's passenger
Sampath Ram as Police officer
Mohan Raman

Production
In 2001, director Sasi and producer Aascar Ravichandran announced plans of making a romantic film tiled Roja Kootam and cast Tarun in the lead role. Following a fallout with the producer, Tarun left the project, with the makers unsuccessfully attempting to bring in either dancer Shobi Paulraj or model Vikranth to play the lead role. After working as a television actor and model, Srikanth was selected to play his first lead role.

During the making of the project, production was stalled several times owing to differences between Sasi and the production studio. Sasi had briefly left the project after Ravichandran made a last-minute decision to cancel a song shoot in New Zealand. "Apple Penne" was initially shot Chikmagalur and Hampi, before Ravichandran asked for a reshoot, suggesting Egypt as a location. The team were later unable to travel to Egypt owing to a passport delay for the lead actress Bhumika Chawla. It was later reshot in Manali, with associate director S. S. Stanley stepping in as a director for the sequence.

Soundtrack

The soundtrack was composed by Bharadwaj. The songs were received well by the audience and were chartbusters.

Reception
Chennai Online wrote "In his debut film 'Sollamale' Sasi had revealed a lot of promise as a director with novel ideas and a fresh narrative style. But there's only glimpses of it here!". The Hindu wrote "Oscar Films 'Roja Koottam' has a refreshing lead pair — Srikanth and Bhumika. It is a routine romantic sojourn all right but there is an attempt at being different".

Awards
2001 - 2002
ITFA Best New Actor Award - Srikanth
Film fans association Award for Best Music Director  -Bharadwaj

References

External links
 

2002 films
2002 romantic drama films
Indian romantic drama films
Films scored by Bharadwaj (composer)
Tamil films remade in other languages
2000s Tamil-language films
Films directed by Sasi (director)